Kenneth Patrick Arthur Mathews (born 10 May 1926) is an English former cricketer. Mathews was a right-handed batsman who bowled right-arm medium pace. He was born at West Worthing, Sussex, and was educated at Felsted School.

Mathews made his first-class debut for Sussex against Cambridge University in 1950. He made three further first-class appearances for the county in that season, against Surrey, Kent and Northamptonshire in the County Championship. He scored his maiden first-class half century against Kent, with a score of 51. The following season, while studying at Clare College, Cambridge, he played first-class cricket for Cambridge University, making his debut for the university against Lancashire at Fenner's. He made eleven further first-class appearances for the university in that season, the last of which came against Oxford University in The University Match at Lord's. He scored 540 runs in his twelve matches for the university, at an average of 25.71, with a high score of 77, which came against Surrey. He also played golf and field hockey for the university, gaining a Blue in each. Mathews also made two further first-class appearances in 1951, for Sussex in the County Championship against Northamptonshire and Hampshire.

In addition to his university studies at Cambridge, Mathews also studied at Yale University in the United States. Returning to England, he made further first-class appearances, in 1954 for the Free Foresters against Cambridge University, scoring 74 in the Free Foresters second-innings, as well as for the Marylebone Cricket Club against Cambridge University in 1955 and for the Free Foresters against the same opposition in 1956.

His father, John, also played first-class cricket.

References

External links
Kenneth Mathews at ESPNcricinfo
Kenneth Mathews at CricketArchive

1926 births
Living people
Sportspeople from Worthing
People educated at Felsted School
Alumni of Clare College, Cambridge
Yale University alumni
English cricketers
Sussex cricketers
Cambridge University cricketers
Free Foresters cricketers
Marylebone Cricket Club cricketers